Patrick Stuart  (–1760) was a Scottish officer in the British Army and a politician.

Stuart was the second son of Alexander Stuart of Torrance and his wife Isabel, daughter of Sir Patrick Nisbet, 1st Baronet, of Edinburgh. James Stuart MP was his older brother.

Stuart  joined the army in 1704 as an ensign in the 1st Foot, was promoted to lieutenant in 1707, and captain in 1727.

He was returned in the interest of the 6th Duke of Hamilton as the Member of Parliament (MP) for Lanarkshire at a by-election in 1750. He held the seat until the next general election, in 1754.

Stuart succeeded to his brother's estates in 1743, and died unmarried in 1760.

References 
 

Year of birth uncertain
1682 births
1760 deaths
Royal Scots officers
Members of the Parliament of Great Britain for Scottish constituencies
British MPs 1747–1754
People from East Dunbartonshire